Essendrop is a surname. Notable people with the surname include:

 Bernhard Ludvig Essendrop (1812–1891), Norwegian politician and priest
 Carl Peter Parelius Essendrop (1818–1893), Norwegian bishop and politician
 Jens Essendrop (1723–1801), Norwegian clergyman and writer
 Ulla Essendrop (born 1976), Indian-born Danish television presenter